Lowry, Denver is a neighborhood of Denver, Colorado, United States.

Lowry, Denver may also refer to various locations in/near the area:
 Lowry Air Force Base, the last designation of the military installation which spanned an area within the neighborhood
 Lowry Field, the 1938–1948 installation
 Lowry Bombing and Gunnery Range, the nearby area used for World War II and Cold War ordnance drops/firing
 Lowry Campus, the academic area of the former Air Force Base, now part of Community College of Aurora
 Lowry Field Number 2, an auxiliary field near Lowry Field, also called Buckley Field